Neighbours from Hell, known in the United States as Neighbors from Hell, is a puzzle strategy game for Nintendo GameCube, Microsoft Windows, Xbox, Nintendo DS, Android and iOS. In Europe, it was released for Windows on June 20, 2003, and the GameCube and Xbox on March 4, 2005. The game was released for Windows in the United States on September 22, 2003.

On October 8, 2020, a remastered compilation of the first two games titled Neighbours Back from Hell was released on Nintendo Switch, PlayStation 4 and Xbox One. It features increased frame rate and HD visuals.

Plot
Woody is an average man who has a happy life, until his neighbor Mr. Rottweiler makes his life miserable. Woody decides to take full revenge on Mr. Rottweiler and calls up a TV crew, which produces the self-titled reality show that shows the neighbor's relations from worst sight.

Gameplay
In the game, the player plays as Woody, who creeps around the Rottweiler's house performing tricks upon the unsuspecting resident. Woody is the star of a new TV show with the same name, with cameras that track every move as the player sets traps such as sawing the chair, banana peels/soap on the floor, smeared paintings and messing with home equipment. The game's objectives are to create disarray, increase ratings, and win awards. Obstacles in the game include the watchful neighbour himself, also - his guard dog, and a parrot called Chilli, both of whom will try to alert the neighbour of Woody's presence. If Woody is caught by the Rottweiler, he is shown being brutally beaten and it is implied that Woody will be beaten to death. Then the episode is failed and player must restart the level.

Each level's goal is to play some crude tricks on your neighbor by using every item near the player's character. Each stage has 4 or 5 zones (not including the training stages). Woody must move from zone to zone, as well as hide under the bed and in wardrobe to avoid being caught. The neighbor moves in the house by his own routine, which can be disrupted in different ways (such as call him to make him go downstairs) or he gets distracted automatically (for example, painting, washing clothes and so on). The game starts with only few rooms (the hall, bathroom, kitchen and the living room), but as the game progresses, more rooms are unlocked (in Season 2 is the balcony and bedroom, and in Season 3 is the basement and study), making the game more difficult.

Reception

The PC version received "average" reviews, while the GameCube and Xbox versions received "generally unfavorable reviews", according to the review aggregation website Metacritic.

Legacy

Ports and re-releases 
The original Microsoft Windows version was digitally re-released on GOG.com with its sequel by JoWood on June 9, 2009. It was released on Steam by Nordic Games on November 7, 2013 after successfully getting Greenlit by the community.

A mobile port of the game was released worldwide by THQ Nordic for iOS and Android on May 25, 2017 on the App Store and Google Play, respectively. A port for macOS was released on the App Store on June 22, 2017.

Neighbours back From Hell 
A remaster, named Neighbours back From Hell, was released on October 8, 2020 for consoles and PC by Vienna-based developer FarbWorks and HandyGames (a publishing division owned by THQ Nordic), and contains both the first game and the sequel, remastered and reworked in HD and at high framerates. It received mixed-to-positive reviews from critics and fans.

It includes overhauled control schemes and interface, tutorial episodes were changed to a tutorial tooltip system, and native controller support were added to the Windows version. Some object storage locations have received a minigame with matching 3 symbols in a slot machine-like window in certain episodes.

Episodes from On Vacation can not be started without prior "seasons" of the original Neighbors from Hell being completed.

Steam and GOG.com releases also include the original versions of the games as a free bonus.

Sequel

In 2004 a sequel was released, called Neighbours from Hell 2: On Vacation. In this game, instead of being in a house, the player travels to various locations around the world. This time the player must have their caution turned to the mom of the Neighbour as well, if they do not want to be caught.

Notes

References

External links
The official website of the Neighbours from Hell series

 
2003 video games
Cancelled PlayStation 2 games
GameCube games
Nintendo DS games
Puzzle video games
Strategy video games
Windows games
Xbox games
iOS games
Android (operating system) games
macOS games
Steam Greenlight games
Video games about revenge
Video games developed in Austria
JoWooD Entertainment games
THQ Nordic games
Embracer Group franchises
Encore Software games
Single-player video games